Turritella bayeri is a species of sea snail, a marine gastropod mollusk in the family Turritellidae.

Distribution

Description 
The maximum recorded shell length is 44 mm.

Habitat 
Minimum recorded depth is 2 m. Maximum recorded depth is 2 m.

References

External links

Turritellidae
Gastropods described in 2001